The following is a list of active equipment of the Somali Armed Forces.

Current Armed Forces vehicles and heavy equipment

Current small arms

Individual Equipment

References 

Military equipment of Somalia
Somalia